"The Reaper" is a song by American electronic duo The Chainsmokers featuring Australian singer Amy Shark. It was released on December 6, 2019 in Australia, as the seventh single from the duo's third studio album, World War Joy.

Background 
On November 26, 2019, during their World War Joy tour, the duo announced that their album was set to be released on December 6. Then, its entire track listing was made available on their store, unveiling this collaboration. On December 4, The Chainsmokers posted the cover of the song on their social media. On December 5, Amy Shark posted the lyric video on her Facebook saying "The Chainsmokers asked me to feature on 'The Reaper' I really love this song it's super sexy and moody AF". Shark later added "What a huge honor to be asked to feature on this track by my boys."

Reception 
Laura English from Music Feeds called the song "a dark, brooding, pop hit, full of classic Chainsmokers production with Shark's vocals [which] really give the track some more depth." Hit Network in Australia called the song "a banger".

Charts

Certification

Release history

References 

2019 songs
2019 singles
The Chainsmokers songs
Amy Shark songs
Songs written by Andrew Taggart
Disruptor Records singles
Columbia Records singles
Songs written by Alex Pall
Songs written by Emily Warren
Song recordings produced by Dann Hume